The 2010–11 Villanova Wildcats men's basketball team  represented Villanova University in the 2010–11 college basketball season. Villanova was led by head coach Jay Wright. The Wildcats participated in the Big East Conference and played their home games at The Pavilion with some select home games at the Wells Fargo Center. They finished the season 21–12, 9–9 in Big East play and lost in the first round of the 2011 Big East men's basketball tournament to South Florida. They received an at-large bid in the 2011 NCAA Division I men's basketball tournament where they lost in the second round to George Mason.

Preseason 
The Villanova Wildcats come back from a 2009–10 season which had a record of 25–8 (13–4) with the season ending in 2nd round of the NCAA Tournament.

Class of 2010 

|-
| colspan="7" style="padding-left:10px;" | Overall Recruiting Rankings:     Scout – UR     Rivals – NR       ESPN – NR 
|}

Season
The Wildcats recorded home wins against Temple and UCLA in their out-of-conference schedule with their only loss coming on the road to Tennessee. They reached as high as #7 in the AP Poll, starting the season 16–1. However, in their fifth Big East contest, they lost at Connecticut. They quickly bounced back with a road win at Syracuse, who was then ranked nationally No. 3. Maalik Wayns had a team-high 21 points in the win. They then lost their next two games, on the road to Providence, and at home against Georgetown.

As of February 1, Corey Stokes is averaging 15.6 points per game, good for tenth in the Big East. Corey Fisher is a close second on the team, with 15.2 ppg. Villanova finished the season with an overall record of 21–11 and lost in the first round of the Big East conference tournament to South Florida, 69–70.  They received a #9 seed in the NCAA tournament and lost to #8 seed George Mason in the second round.

Schedule

|-
!colspan=9 style=| Exhibition

|-
!colspan=9 style=| Regular season

|-
!colspan=9 style=| Big East tournament

|-
!colspan=9 style=| NCAA tournament

Rankings

Roster

References

Villanova Wildcats
Villanova Wildcats men's basketball seasons
Villanova Wildcats